Matthew Barham Luke (born October 29, 1976) is an American football coach and former player who, most recently served as the associate head coach and offensive line coach at the University of Georgia. 

Luke was fired from his previous job as the head coach at the University of Mississippi after amassing a 15–21 record over three seasons.

Playing career 
Luke was born in Gulfport, Mississippi. He was a standout at Gulfport High School, but he was a walk-on at Ole Miss, where scholarships were limited because of NCAA sanctions. He played center there from 1995 to 1998, graduating in 2000. His father, Tommy Luke, played defensive back at Ole Miss in the 1960s while his older brother, Tom Luke, played quarterback there from 1989 to 1991. As a senior, he played in the 1998 Independence Bowl against Texas Tech.

Coaching career

Assistant coach 
Luke exhausted his eligibility after the 1999 season but joined the coaching staff as a graduate assistant. After graduating from Ole Miss in 2000 with a Bachelor of Business Administration, he took a job with Murray State University as an offensive line coach. Following the 2001 season, he returned to Ole Miss to coach offensive line and tight ends under head coach David Cutcliffe. Ole Miss fired Cutcliffe after the 2004 season, but new head coach Ed Orgeron retained Luke as part of his staff. 

Luke departed Ole Miss in 2006 to be reunited with Cutcliffe at the University of Tennessee, where Cutcliffe was the assistant head coach and offensive coordinator under head coach Phillip Fulmer. Luke coached the offensive line and tight ends at Tennessee for two seasons (2006–2007). 

In early 2008, Duke University hired Cutcliffe as its new head coach, and Cutcliffe brought several Tennessee assistants with him, including Luke. At Duke, Luke was co-offensive coordinator with responsibility for the running game, while also coaching the offensive line. Luke departed Duke at the end of the 2011 season to rejoin the Ole Miss coaching staff under new head coach Hugh Freeze. At Ole Miss, he had a similar role: co-offensive coordinator and offensive line coach.

Head coach
On July 20, 2017, Luke became the interim head coach at Ole Miss after Freeze was forced to resign. After a late season push to finish 6–6, Ole Miss removed the interim tag on November 26, 2017 and named Luke the 37th head football coach in school history. Ole Miss did not play in a bowl game;  it had withdrawn from bowl consideration in response to NCAA rules violations committed when Freeze was head coach. The school and NCAA also imposed additional penalties, including a second post-season ban for the 2018 season (which also allowed athletes near the end of their eligibility to transfer without penalty); three years of NCAA probation; reductions in scholarships; and recruiting restrictions.

Ole Miss finished with losing records in the next two seasons, resulting in Luke's firing on December 1, 2019.

Georgia 
On December 10, 2019, Luke joined the Georgia football staff as an offensive line coach and associate head coach.  He helped guide the 2021 Georgia Bulldogs football team to the national championship. On February 21, 2022, he stepped down from his position, citing a need to spend more time with his family.

Head coaching record

References

External links
 Georgia Bulldogs bio

1976 births
American football centers
Living people
Duke Blue Devils football coaches
Georgia Bulldogs football coaches
Murray State Racers football coaches
Ole Miss Rebels football coaches
Ole Miss Rebels football players
Tennessee Volunteers football coaches
People from Gulfport, Mississippi
Coaches of American football from Mississippi
Players of American football from Mississippi